Pearson, named for Frederick Stark Pearson, is an unincorporated community in Medina County, Texas, United States. It is part of the San Antonio Metropolitan Statistical Area. Pearson was established in 1912 by the San Antonio Suburban Irrigation Company as a stop on the Southern Pacific Railroad.  The community lies approximately seven miles west of LaCoste on FM 471 South and before the Noonan Switch and Natalia. It was formerly the site of a shop, a machinery and material yard, and a house for a caretaker.

References

1912 establishments in Texas
Greater San Antonio
Populated places established in 1912
Unincorporated communities in Medina County, Texas
Unincorporated communities in Texas